Pylaemenes konchurangensis is a species of stick insects native in Vietnam. The species has been described in the genus Pylaemenes, but from its morphological characters it belongs in the genus Orestes.

Characteristics 
Pylaemenes konchurangensis is an elongated species that has very few structures on the body surface and whose females resemble  Pylaemenes konkakinhensis which was described at the same time. There is only one tubercle on the outer edge of the first antenna segment, while there are two in Pylaemenes konkakinhensis. Pylaemenes konchurangensis females have granular tubercles on the posterior, lateral aspect of the fourth tergite of the abdomen. Their subgenital plate is not pointed. The occiput is raised to a posteriorly converging, V-shaped crest. Six small swellings can be seen on the back edge of the head. The  pronotum is square. Its front edge is curved inwards. On the fourth to seventh tergites of the abdomen there are medial X-shaped structures. The second and third tergites are parallel-sided, the fourth widens posteriorly, while the fifth and sixth tergites narrows posteriorly. The seventh tergite has medial posterior a protuberance called preopercular organ. On the poserior ninth tergite is an elongated crest. The coloring of the females is dominated by light beige and brown tones and is more typical of females of the genus Orestes.

Most notable are the three short medial protuberances and the two anterior spines on the crest of the occiput. Pro-, meso- and metanotum are similar in size to females. The abdomen is slender, cylindrical and rare granulated.

Taxonomy 
One of the females was declared a holotype, the other and the male as paratypes. The females are deposited at the Manchester Museum and the male at the collection of Hong Kong Entomological Society. The species name refers to the place where the specimens were found.

As part of the description of six new Orestesspecies from Vietnam, Joachim Bresseel and Jérôme Constant established a new differentiation between the genera Pylaemenes and Orestes in January 2018, which was confirmed in 2021 by genetic analysis. According to this, Pylaemenes konchurangensis must be transferred to the genus Orestes.

Terraristics 
As of 2019/2020, a sexual stock collected by Bresseel and Constant in Kon Plông district is in breeding. Because the animals in both sexes closely resemble the description of Pylaemenes konchurangensis, Bresseel named them Orestes cf. konchurangensis 'Kong Plong' passed on.

References 

Phasmatodea
Phasmatodea of Indo-China
Insects described in 2018